Onoba exarata is a species of minute sea snail, a marine gastropod mollusk or micromollusk in the family Rissoidae.

Distribution

Description 
The maximum recorded shell length is 3.3 mm.

Habitat 
Minimum recorded depth is 5 m. Maximum recorded depth is 5 m.

References

Rissoidae
Gastropods described in 1851